Alkamergen is a lake in May District, Pavlodar Region, Kazakhstan.

Geography
It is one of the largest lakes in the district. There are a number of smaller lakes in its vicinity. Sulysor, the largest one, is located to the west of the southern shore.

River Ashchysu flows into Alkamergen from the west. The water of the lake is brackish, fresher in the spring and with increased salinity in the summer. In years of drought the level of Alkamergen sinks and the northern end becomes a separate lake connected with the southern section by a narrow sound.

Flora and fauna
The shores of the lake are mostly flat. The main fish species in Alkamergen are pike, perch and common bream.

See also
List of lakes of Kazakhstan

References

External links

Lower and Upper Cambrian Bradoriida, Ostracoda, of northeastern Central Kazakhstan

Lakes of Kazakhstan
Pavlodar Region
Endorheic basins of Asia